Vasily Dolgorukov:

 Vasily Lukich Dolgorukov
 Vasily Vladimirovich Dolgorukov
 Vasily Alexandrovich Dolgorukov (1868–1918), Marshal of the Imperial Court under Tsar Nicholas II
 Vasily Andreyevich Dolgorukov (1804–1868), head of the Third Section of H.I.M. Chancellery (1856–1866)

See also
House of Dolgorukov